The 2015-16 Welsh Football League Division One (referred to as Nathaniel Cars Welsh League Division One for sponsorship reasons) is current season of the top football league in South Wales. Mirroring its North Wales counterpart the Cymru Alliance, the 16-team division forms half of the second tier of the Welsh football league system and falls one level below the nationwide Welsh Premier League. The season began on Saturday 15 August 2015 and is set to conclude on Saturday 12 March 2016.

Clubs competing in Welsh Football League Division One  are eligible for promotion to the Welsh Premier League for 2016-17, should they finish in the top two positions and achieve the league's Domestic Licence. Current champions Caerau Ely did not meet this criteria, allowing runners-up Haverfordwest County to be promoted instead.

Clubs and stadia

Promotion and relegation

Added to the division for 2015-16

 Barry Town United (promoted)
 Aberbargoed Buds (promoted)
 Risca United (promoted)

Removed from the division for 2015-16

 Haverfordwest County (promoted)
 Pontardawe Town (relegated)
 AFC Porth (relegated)

External links
 Official Welsh League Division One fixtures
 Official Welsh League Division One results
 Official Welsh League Division One table

2015–16 in Welsh football
Welsh Football League Division One seasons